The Sony Center is a Sony-sponsored complex of eight buildings located at the Potsdamer Platz in Berlin, Germany, designed by Helmut Jahn. It opened in 2000 and houses Sony's German headquarters. The cinemas in the center were closed at the end of 2019.

History

In the early 20th century, the site was originally home to Berlin's bustling city center. During World War II, it was the location of the infamous Nazi People's Court. Most of the buildings in its vicinity were destroyed or damaged during World War II. From 1961 onwards, most of the area became part of the "No Man's Land" of the Berlin Wall, resulting in the destruction of the remaining buildings. After the fall of the Berlin Wall on 9 November 1989, the square became the focus of attention again, as a large (some ), attractive location in the heart of a major European capital city had suddenly become available.

As part of a redevelopment effort for the area, the space was to be developed. In 1992, Sony acquired the  site from the Berlin city government for 97.2 million German marks, about US$61.6 million. Shortly after, the European Commission briefly investigated whether Sony paid less than the market price. Over the following years, a total of eight buildings were designed by Helmut Jahn and Peter Walker as landscape architect, and construction was completed in 2000 at a total cost of 750 million euros.

The iconic  vaulted roof covering the central open area between the main buildings was engineered and built by Waagner-Biro using steel, glass and translucent fabric.

In February 2008 Sony sold the Sony Center for less than 600 million euros to a group of German and US investment funds, including investment bank Morgan Stanley, Corpus Sireo and an affiliate of The John Buck Company. The group sold the Sony Center to the National Pension Service of South Korea for 570 million euros in 2010.

In 2017, Oxford Properties and Madison International Realty acquired the complex for close to 1.1 billion euros.

From 1999 until 2019, CineStar operated a cinema, Cinestar Sony Center, and an IMAX theater in the center. Both were used for screenings in the Berlin International Film Festival until their closure.

Design 
Architects Murphy/Jahn sought to create a complex where the outside was the "real" city, while inside was a "virtual" city, reinforcing this dichotomy through a series of passages and gates. The design's use of light, both natural and artificial, creates an environment that is "luminous, not illuminated."

When the building opened, the Chicago Tribune wrote: "Jahn's design for the Sony Center bears a superficial resemblance to the dizzying atrium of his James R. Thompson Center in Chicago's Loop because its buildings wrap around a big public space. But unlike the Thompson Center, the Sony Center's public space, called the Forum, has an umbrella-like roof of steel, glass and fabric partly open to the elements, with a cone-shaped, 30-foot-wide opening in its center."

Hochtief was the general contractor; Jaros, Baum & Bolles provided MEP engineering; and the structural engineering consultants were BGS Ingenieursozietät and Ove Arup & Partners.

Attractions
The Sony Center contains a mix of shops, restaurants, a conference center, hotel rooms, around 67 residential units, offices, the Museum of Film and Television, a Legoland Discovery Center, and a "Sony Style" store.

Free Wi-Fi is available. During major sports events like the 2006 FIFA World Cup, it was also home to a large television screen on which the games were shown to viewers sitting in the large open area in the middle.

The Sony Center is located near Berlin Potsdamer Platz railway station, which can be accessed on foot. A large, covered shopping center, the Mall of Berlin, is nearby, as are many hotels, Deutsche Bahn central offices, along with an office building that is home to the fastest elevator in Europe.

Gallery

References

External links

 
 

Buildings and structures in Berlin
Skyscrapers in Berlin
High-tech architecture
Tensile membrane structures
Sony
Helmut Jahn buildings
Skyscraper office buildings in Germany
Residential skyscrapers in Germany
Skyscraper hotels in Germany
Commercial buildings completed in 2000